Mikhail Mamiashvili (born 1963 in Konotop, Ukrainian SSR) is a Russian wrestler of Georgian origin. He won an Olympic gold medal in Greco-Roman wrestling in 1988 in Seoul, South Korea, competing for the Soviet Union.

Career
In 1978 along with his parents Mamiashvili moved to Moscow, Russian SFSR. He won gold medals at the 1983, 1985 and 1986 World Wrestling Championships and won the European championship in 1986. He also won two silver medal at the World Wrestling Championships in 1989, 1990. He was USSR National Champion in 1984, 1987, and 1988.  He is currently the President of Russian Wrestling Federation and one of the most powerful men in International Olympic wrestling serving as a FILA Bureau Member (Federation of Associated Wrestling Style)(www.fila-wrestling.com).Mamiashvili was inducted in the FILA Hall of Fame in 2008 for his many accomplishments as an athlete and administrator for Soviet/Russian wrestling.

He is the current chairperson and president of the Wrestling Federation of Russia[:ru].

Controversy
At the 2004 Summer Olympics, Mamiashvili was accused by a Swedish board member of wrestling's international governing body for giving signs to a referee of a gold medal match involving a Russian wrestler. When the board member informed Mamiashvili of the accusation, Mamiashvili purportedly told him: "You should know that this may lead to your death," despite evidence found by the board member that the referee had been bribed.

In 2015, Mamiashvili was denied a United States visa to attend the UWW World Championships in Las Vegas.

At the 2016 Summer Olympics, Mamiashvili was accused of punching Russia's 63 kg female wrestler Inna Trazhukova in the face twice following her loss to Poland's Monika Michalik in the bronze medal match. Mamiashvili does not deny punching Trazhukova, claiming he wanted to punish her for a lack of effort.

He is currently the Vice President of United World Wrestling and head of the Wrestling Federation of Russia.

References

External links
 Mamiashvili's Gangster Ways

1963 births
Living people
People from Konotop
Soviet male sport wrestlers
Olympic wrestlers of the Soviet Union
Wrestlers at the 1988 Summer Olympics
Ukrainian male sport wrestlers
Olympic gold medalists for the Soviet Union
Olympic medalists in wrestling
Ukrainian people of Georgian descent
World Wrestling Championships medalists
Medalists at the 1988 Summer Olympics
European Wrestling Championships medalists
Sportspeople from Sumy Oblast